Anne-Marie Blanc (1919–2009) was born on 2 September 1919 in Vevey, Vaud, Switzerland. She was a Swiss film and television actress. She died on 5 February 2009 in Zurich, Switzerland.

Selected filmography
 Constable Studer (1939)
 Gilberte de Courgenay (1942)
 That's Not the Way to Die (1946)
 White Cradle Inn (1949)
 Captive Soul (1952)
 Palace Hotel (1952)
 I'm Waiting for You (1952)
 Life Begins at Seventeen (1953)
 Spring Song (1954)
 Via Mala (1961)
 The Blonde from Peking (1967)
  (1969, TV film)
 Violanta (1976)
 A Crime of Honour ( A Song for Europe, 1985, TV film)
 Klassäzämekunft (1988)
 Lüthi und Blanc (2001–2005, TV series)

References

External links

1919 births
2009 deaths
People from Vevey
Swiss film actresses
Swiss television actresses
20th-century Swiss actresses
21st-century Swiss actresses